Stunts Unlimited is a 1980 American action film about stunt performers directed by Hal Needham.

Plot
A group of professional stunt performers is hired by a former U.S. Intelligence agent to retrieve a stolen weapon from a dangerous arms dealer.

Cast

 Chip Mayer as Matt Lewis
 Susanna Dalton as C.C. Brandt
 Sam J. Jones as Bo Carlson
 Glenn Corbett as Dirk Macauley
 Linda Grovenor as Jody Webber
 Alejandro Rey as Fernando Castilla
 Stefan Gierasch as Axel Kalb
 Victor Mohica as Joe Tallia
 Lina Raymond as Cora 
 Alfie Wise as Tom
 Hal Needham as H.N.
 Arthur Weiss as Fall Director
 Richard Ziker as The Star
 John Larroquette as Leading Man
 Linda McClure as 1st Assistant Director
 Victoria Peters as Rhea
 Peaches Pook as Waitress
 Sandy Lang as 2nd Assistant Director
 Graydon Gould as Western Director
 Joe Montana
 Nicholas David as Fred
 Danny Rogers as Fire Stuntman
 Alan Gibbs as Rider #1
 Monty Laird as Pistol Stuntman
 Mickey Gilbert as Horse Rider
 Walter Wyatt as Rider #2
 Stan Barrett as Tower Stuntman
 Charles Picerni as Air Stuntman
 Stefan Gudju as Gate Guard
 Maureen Cavaretta as Trapeze Lady #1
 Vicki Mathaway as Trapeze Lady #2
 Charles A. Tamburro as Bunker Guard
 Jophery C. Brown as Roving Guard
 Richard Lapp as Minor Role

Production
The title of the film is an homage to the real company Stunts Unlimited, a stunt group formed by Hal Needham, Glenn Wilder, and Ronnie Rondell in 1970.

Broadcast and reception
The TV movie was broadcast on ABC at 9:30 p.m. Eastern Time on January 4, 1980 as the pilot for a proposed series but the series was not picked up.
Upon the film's broadcast, the staff of People wrote that "the idea is ingenious" and "it ought to be a series".

References

External links
 

1980 television films
1980 films
1980 action films
ABC network original films
American action television films
Films about arms trafficking
Films about stunt performers
Films directed by Hal Needham
Films scored by Barry De Vorzon
Paramount Television
Television pilots not picked up as a series
1980s English-language films